Dedeli is a town (belde) and municipality in the Patnos District, Ağrı Province, Turkey. Its population is 3,141 (2021).

References

Populated places in Ağrı Province
Towns in Turkey